Legacy of Murder is a British comedy television series which originally aired on BBC in six half-hour episodes between 16 February and 23 March 1982. A struggling London private detective and his assistant are hired by a lawyer to locate six people concerned with the inheritance  of an eccentric aristocrat. It is also known as Emery Presents: Legacy of Murder. As he did on The Dick Emery Show, Emery portrayed several different characters.

Partial Cast
 Dick Emery as Bernie Weinstock/Various characters
 Barry Evans as Robin Bright
 Richard Vernon as Roland Tolhurst
 Delia Paton as Miss Stevens
 Robert Mill as Desmond Danvers-Crichton
 Martin Wimbush as Clive Danvers-Crichton
 Thomas Baptiste as O'Toole
 Lee Whitlock as Wayne
 Patsy Rowlands as Thelma
 Colin Fay as Sid
 Jim Dowdall as Suleiman
 Barbara Murray as Sarah
 Eddie Tagoe as Baron Climeterre
 Glyn Edwards as Henchman
 John Horsley as Retired Headmaster
 Susie Silvey as The Stripper

References

External links
 

1980s British comedy television series
1982 British television series debuts
BBC television comedy